The Real Dirty Dancing is an Australian talent show-themed television series that premiered on Seven Network on 30 September 2019. The series follows eight celebrities who revisit key locations and moments from the movie Dirty Dancing and learn the iconic dance routines under the guidance of choreographers Todd McKenney and Kym Johnson.

Contestants
 Hugh Sheridan
 Jessica Rowe
 Jamie Durie
 Anne Edmonds
 Stephanie Rice
 Firass Dirani
 Jude Bolton
 Anna Heinrich

Episodes

American version 

On 19 January 2022, an American version was announced. It was hosted by Stephen "tWitch" Boss and produced by Eureka Productions and Lionsgate Television. It premiered on 1 February 2022 on Fox.

British version 
On 25 August 2021, Channel 4 announced that the British version would be hosted by Leigh Francis (formerly from Channel 4's Bo' Selecta!, and appearing in character as Keith Lemon on The Real Dirty Dancing), Pussycat Dolls member Ashley Roberts, and Dreamboys choreographer Jordan Darrell. This version is produced by Fremantle's Thames production company and premiered in February 2022 on E4.

References

External links 
 
 The Real Dirty Dancing on 7plus

Seven Network original programming
2019 Australian television series debuts
2019 Australian television series endings
2010s Australian reality television series
Television series by Eureka
English-language television shows
Dance competition television shows